Kremis is a small town and commune in the Cercle of Yélimané in the Kayes Region of south-western Mali. In 2009 the commune had a population of 10,467.

References

External links
.

Communes of Kayes Region